Super Prep is a sports magazine based in Laguna Beach, California, published in since 1985. It was founded and is published by Allen Wallace, a lawyer. Its main focus is to provide recruiting information on high school football players.

In 1987, the Boston Globe wrote: "In three short years, Super Prep has become an essential tool for recruiting coordinators nationwide."  The San Diego Tribune called it "one of the more respected services," and the Los Angeles Times called it "usually a reliable source".

References

Sports magazines published in the United States
Magazines established in 1985
1985 establishments in California
Magazines published in Los Angeles